Songs for the Living is the fourth and final album by the Christian rock band Embodyment. This album continues in the direction of the band's lighter sound, and is the biggest departure from the band's extreme metal roots, and contains prominent indie rock influences.

Critical reception
Andy Kelly of Jesus Freak Hideout wrote "Overall, Songs for the Living is a very solid release that takes Embodyment in incredible new directions, including great vocals and melodies that will be stuck in your head for weeks to come.", while Kevin Gordon of AllMusic wrote "Embodyment's Songs for The Living makes a convincing pitch for mainstream success."

Track listing

Credits
Embodyment
 Sean Corbray - Vocals
 Andrew Godwin - Guitar
 Derrick "Stone" Wadsworth - Guitar
 Jason Lindquist - Bass
 Mark Garza - Drums

Production
 Barry Poynter - Recording
 Edward Phillips - Executive Producer
 Michael Lewis - Executive Producer
 Roger E. Bishara - Legal Representation
 Jason Magnussen - Recording
 Mr. Colson - Mixing
 Scott Hull - Mastering
 Bruce Fitzhugh - A&R
 Kris McCaddon - Photography, Design

References

2002 albums
Embodyment albums